Christian Wirth (born 27 April 1963) is a German politician for the Alternative for Germany (AfD) and since 2017 member of the Bundestag.

Life and politics

Wirth was born 1963 in the West German town of Neunkirchen and studied jurisprudence in order to become a lawyer. Wirth entered the populist AfD in 2015 and became a member of the bundestag after the 2017 German federal election. He was member of the academic fencing fraternity 'Burschenschaft Normannia zu Heidelberg'

References

1963 births
Members of the Bundestag for Saarland
Living people
Members of the Bundestag 2021–2025
Members of the Bundestag 2017–2021
Members of the Bundestag for the Alternative for Germany